McPhail Memorial Baptist Church is a Baptist church in Ottawa, Ontario, Canada. It is affiliated with Canadian Baptists of Ontario and Quebec.

History
The church was founded in 1888 as an offshoot of First Baptist Church. Its current home was completed in 1893. It is one of Ottawa's best known examples of late-nineteenth century revivalist architecture. The church is named after Rev. Daniel McPhail who served as a minister and itinerant preacher in the Ottawa area for many decades.

External links 
Official site

References 

Churches in Ottawa
Baptist churches in Canada
Religious organizations established in 1888